Caecum glabrum is a species of minute sea snail, a marine gastropod mollusk or micromollusk in the family Caecidae.

Description

Distribution

References

External links

Caecidae
Gastropods described in 1803